Viktor An (born Ahn Hyun-soo on November 23, 1985), is a South Korean-born Russian short-track speed skating coach and retired short-track speed skater. With a total of eight Olympic medals, six gold and two bronze, he is the only short track speed skater in Olympic history to win gold in every distance, and the first to win a medal in every distance at a single Games. He has the most Olympic gold medals in the sport, three of which he won in the 2006 Winter Olympics and the other three in the 2014 Winter Olympics. Considered to be the greatest short track speed skater of all time, he is a six-time overall World champion (2003-2007, 2014), two-time overall World Cup winner (2003–04, 2005–06), and the 2014 European champion. He holds the most overall titles at the World Short Track Speed Skating Championships, and is the only male short track skater to win five consecutive world titles.

In 2008, Ahn suffered a knee injury and could not regain his health by the time the national qualifiers for Vancouver 2010 came around. His recovery being slow and his South Korean local team dissolved in 2010, Ahn, aiming for his second Olympics, became a Russian citizen the next year and began racing for the Russian team. After winning gold in Sochi, Ahn explained his reasons for joining the Russian team saying, "I wanted to train in the best possible environment and I proved my decision was not wrong." As expected, a gold-winning athlete leaving the national team caused public uproar in South Korea. However, it was aimed not at Ahn, but at the country's skating union. Most South Korean fans in a poll said they understood his decision. Ahn continued his skating career in his adopted nation until 2019 and declared his retirement in April 2020.

Early life and education
Ahn began skating in 1993 in his first year of primary school. The first time he watched the sport on television was during the 1994 Winter Olympics in Lillehammer where one of his heroes, Chae Ji-hoon, took gold in the 500 m and silver in the 1000 m for South Korea. Incidentally, these were the Games where Russia achieved a national record of 11 Olympic golds, a feat that he himself would help to repeat twenty years later. His coach, Kim Ki-hoon, was a three-time Olympic gold medalist who scouted Ahn and continued to train him. He trained ten hours every day from techniques, speed, and endurance to video analysis.

Career

2000s

Early career and the 2002 Winter Olympics
Ahn made his international debut at the World Junior Short Track Speed Skating Championships in 2002. Finishing first in the 1500 m, 1000 m, and 5000 m relay events, he claimed the overall title.

Ahn then participated in the 2002 Winter Olympics in Salt Lake City. He made the finals for the 1000 m event but returned home without a medal, after a controversial fall involving Apolo Ohno, Li Jiajun, and Mathieu Turcotte that allowed Australian Steve Bradbury to sweep the gold medal. Ahn finished in fourth place, behind Ohno and Turcotte.

After the 2002 Olympics, Ahn finished second to Kim Dong-sung at his first senior-level world championship competition the same year, almost duplicating Kim's feat of winning both the Junior and Senior World Championship titles in 1997.

Ahn began dominating the sport from the 2002–2003 season. As well as claiming four overall and 1500 m World Championship titles in a row between 2003 and 2006, Ahn excelled himself at 1000 m and 3000 m during that period and also starred with the Republic of Korea's 5000 m relay team. In all, he won a total of 23 medals in that prolific spell, and took the 2004 and 2006 World Cup titles for good measure. He also set the world records for the 1500 m in 2003 at World Cup #2 in Marquette and the 3000 m at World Cup #4 in Beijing, which he held for the following eight years.

faction and national team 'recommendation system'
South Korea has produced many outstanding short track speed skaters and is highly competitive in selecting the national team. Their key method of selecting players is to automatically select the best players in advance according to the comprehensive podium rankings of the World Championships. However, there is a system that has disappeared after much controversy and factional strife. It was the 'recommendation system'.

South Korea's elite sports system was strictly a top-down relationship between leaders and athletes. and the factions were formed according to the leaders and the factions of the players were also determined by their universities and leaders. And the players was disadvantaged if he disobeyed the instructions from the factional leader.  Viktor Ahn is one of these representative players.

Ahn graduated from Korea National Sport University. His leaders were Kim Ki-hoon, a three-time Olympic champion, and Jeon Myung-kyu, former vice president of the Korea Skating Union who was also the head coach of the Korean short track speed skating team from 1987 to 2002. Ahn won the all of the junior world championship and continued to perform well in domestic competitions as a junior, but did not participate in the national team trials. However, head coach decided to put the 16 year old Ahn on the national team instead of an injured player.  The 2002 Olympics was his Senior international debut. In addition to Ahn, many athletes and leaders were recommended by the Korea Skating Union. They were Chae Ji-hoon, Chun Lee-kyung, Kim So-hee, Choi Min-kyung Ko Gi-hyun, Lee Ho-suk, and Choi Eun-kyung, and also included were Kim Dong-sung and Kim Sun-tae, who were injured and failed to participate in the national team trials.

2005 Winter Universiade
Ahn was reported to be the victim of senior player Seo Ho-jin's assault at the 2005 Winter Universiade. Though Seo was expelled from the national team and Yoon Jae-myung, head coach for the event, was dismissed on charges of match-fixing, Seo returned to the national team for the 2006 Winter Olympics the next year.

Ahn refused to join the national team and take training in 2005 and also confronted with the leaders of the Korea Skating Union. In July 2005, parents and coaches, including Ahn and Choi Eun-kyung, Sung Si-bak held a press conference and exposed coach Yoon Jae-myung's Aiding and abetting assault. It also called for the resignation of all federation leaders and announced its absence from the 2006 Turin Olympics. As a result, coach Yoon's appointment has been canceled. However, the conflict at that time was at its peak. In the end, this incident resulted in Ahn training alone in the women's team, not the men's.

The issue came back to the fore after Ahn's victory as a Russian in the 2014 Winter Olympics, as the South Korean public questioned the Korea Skating Union of losing their biggest Olympic star. Regarding the uproar against him, Seo argued that the incident was just a form of discipline from senior to junior, but Ahn revealed in 2015 that he and his junior were hit with helmets on.

2006 Winter Olympics
At the 2006 Winter Olympics, Ahn won gold medals in the 1500 m and 1000 m events. He set a new Olympic record time of 1:26.739 in the 1000 m, finishing ahead of teammate Lee Ho-suk and rival Ohno. Ahn also won gold in men's 5000 m relay along with teammates Lee Ho-suk, Seo Ho-jin, and Song Suk-woo. With his patented outside overtaking maneuver, he overtook defending champion Canada to get his third gold medal of the Games. Ahn became the second South Korean athlete ever to win three gold medals in one Olympics, following Jin Sun-yu who had accomplished this earlier on the same day. He also won a bronze medal in the 500 m event. Ahn was the only athlete in Turin to step on to the podium four times.

Ahn became the first short track speed skater to win a medal in every distance at a single Games, a feat unprecedented by any athlete in his sport. He is the first South Korean man to win at least 3 medals in a single Winter Olympics.

Following the 2006 Olympics, Ahn maintained his record at the 2006 World Championships in Minneapolis. Despite being disqualified in the finals of the 500 m and 3000 m events, his victories in both the 1000 m and 1500 m events helped him defend his title with 68 points, followed by countryman Lee Ho-suk with 60 points. He became the first male short track skater to win four consecutive world titles.

After Torino
After the 2006 World Championships, Ahn flew back to South Korea. At Incheon International Airport, Ahn's father had a loud quarrel with the vice president of the Korea Skating Union (KSU), claiming that the coach did not associate with Ahn and conspired with other skaters to prevent Ahn from winning the title of overall champion.

Ahn collided with Lee Ho-suk and Oh Se-jong in the World Championship 3000m Super Final. The airport incident, which was reported on news screens as said, caused a stir in the media and the public along with factional issues. as a result, the Korea Skating Union said it would hold a committee meeting to consider disciplinary action. On April 26, 2006, the reward and punishment committee concluded that "it was not an intentional collision after  playing the videos more than 100 times," and that Ahn Hyun-soo, Lee Ho-suk, and Oh Se-jong were all unintentional.

The South Korean short track team was split into two groups, in one of which Ahn was being coached by the women's coach due to conflicts with the men's coach. even though Ahn was the main player winning the gold medal in the Turin Olympics 5000m relay, the men's team members held a ceremony to their mentor, excluding only Ahn Hyun-soo. The tensions had risen so high that the skaters refused to dine in the same room, sit next to each other on the plane, or even share the same floor with each other. Ahn and Lee Ho-suk used to attend the same high school together, and even shared a room the previous year in skating camps, but due to the conflict they had begun to rarely speak to each other. 
Ahn mentioned on his personal website that the pressure was too much for him and he contemplated quitting the sport. Due to the issue, KSU stated that starting next season, the team would be united under one head coach to prevent deleterious rivalries.

In spite of the conflicts, Ahn continued to dominate the sport. At the 2007 World Championships held in Milan, Ahn won his fifth world championship, finishing first in the 1000 m and in the 5000 m relay with teammates Sung Si-bak, Song Kyung-taek, and Kim Hyun-kon. He also won silver in the 3000 m behind Song, and won two bronze medals in the 500 m and the 1500 m. With this victory, Ahn became the first man to win five consecutive world championships. Ahn is the only male short track skater to have won at least three consecutive world championships; Canadian short track legend Marc Gagnon has won four times, but his titles did not come back to back.

Injury in early 2008
On January 16, 2008, the Korea Skating Union (KSU) reported that Ahn had injured his knee after colliding with a fence during national team training at the Korea Training Center in Taeneung. The skate blade got stuck on the ice then the Ahn fell and bumped his knee on the fence. The fence, placed to absorb the shock, froze hard like a rock, causing serious injury rather than absorbing the impact. After being sent to the hospital, the injury was diagnosed as a fractured knee.

Due to the injury, KSU announced that Ahn would not be competing in the ISU Samsung World Cup Series #5 and #6 in Quebec City and Salt Lake City, respectively. It was also reported that he would not be competing in the 2008 World Championships in Gangneung or the 2008 World Team Championships in Harbin, China. As a result of the unexpected injury, it was clear that Ahn would be unable to defend his sixth World title, leaving his countrymen Lee Ho-suk, Song Kyung-taek, and Lee Seung-hoon to make up the ground. After undergoing three surgeries, his rehabilitation period was predicted to be around 2–3 months.

After eight months off the ice, a South Korean news article reported on September 5, 2008, that Ahn was back training, undergoing approximately two hours of physical reinforcement and skating along with around five hours of rehabilitation accompanied by muscular power training. The article also reported that Ahn was eyeing the 2010 Winter Olympics in Vancouver, Canada. 

However, his recovery from the injury was much slower than initially expected, and he had to undergo four surgeries in 15 months.

In 2009, Ahn finished seventh overall at the Korean national team trials, which was not enough for him to qualify for the Olympic team. Not having fully recovered from his injury, he again was unable to qualify for the national team in the following season. In turn, Ahn served as a commentator for SBS Sports on the season's World Cup series and World Championships.

2010s

2010, Conflict with Korea Skating Union   
In March 2010, Ahn's father, Ahn Ki-Won, revealed that Lee Jung-su forfeited the individual competition at the world championships because of external pressure, not injury. athletes traded the rights to participate in the Olympics and the World Championships under the instructions of the coaches . and each other helped the Olympic national team trials. This incident had a huge impact. The players involved and the Vancouver Olympic coaches have all been disciplined. The leaders of the Korea Skating Union were all forced to resign.

Ahn became a whistleblower who informed the South Korean society of the dark side of Korean shorttrack speed skating of factional strife and match-fixing regardless of his will. And it took a toll on him, officially or informally. The selection of the national team was suddenly postponed, and Ahn Hyun-soo, who overlapped with the basic military training period, disrupted his own training plan. Suspicions have also been raised that he missed an Olympic opportunity by disobeying the factional leader's words. Noise and controversy continued around him regarding factional issues and the way the national team was selected.

And his team Seongnam City declared a moratorium in July 2010 and decided to dismantle the ice skating team in December 2010. But there was not a team to scouted Ahn Hyun-soo.

Naturalization to Russia
Ahn last competed as a South Korean citizen at the national team trials in April 2011, where he took gold in the 500 m. Prior to the trials, his local team Seongnam City Hall dissolved due to financial reasons, and therefore Ahn had to train by himself. After the trials, Ahn announced that he will be moving to Russia because he wanted to skate in an environment where he could concentrate in skating, apart from the issues surrounding him.

He moved to Russia on June 2011 and decided to naturalize on July. On December 28, 2011, he was officially granted a Russian nationality by President Dmitry Medvedev. His Korean nationality was automatically extinguished by the Korean Nationality Act, which does not allow dual nationality. Since then, South Korean media has reported that he received the full Olympic medal pension in July 2011, and decided to naturalized to Russia in August. Based on this, when the Korea skating coach union pointed out "pension receipt" due to "morality" issues in the process of hiring Seongnam City coaches in 2023, Viktor Ahn said he decided on everything in July 2011 and donated the entire pension just before Russian naturalization for the first time in 12 years.

In 2015 MBC documentary, Ahn said. : Just before naturalization of Russia, there was a pressure from an official of the Korea Skating Union to the Russian Skating Union, saying, "This athlete is a problematic player in Korea and should never be accepted."

2011, Conflict with the South Korean coaches
South Korean coaches and staff were already in Russia before Ahn decided to go to Russia. But in October 2011, the Russian Skating Union fired everyone, leaving Viktor Ahn alone. According to South Korean media reports at the time, 'internal conflicts between leaders', 'South Korean experts never notified Russian coaches how to prepare skating equipment accordingly in shorttrack speed skating', 'compulsory training ' and 'corporal punishment on athletes' were the reasons for the dismissal.

At that time, however, there were rumors in South Korea that Ahn was reluctant to undergo Korean-style training again. After this incident, coach Hwang Ik-hwan and Ahn’s wife Woo Nari, who were coaches of his team for Seongnam City just before his naturalization, were invited to Russia for Viktor Ahn's rehabilitation and psychotherapy.

Heading to Sochi 
Ahn participated in the Russian national team trials for the 2011–2012 season and was selected as a relay member for the season. He made his debut as a Russian short track speed skater at World Cup #5 in Moscow.

In the national trials for the 2012–2013 season, Ahn won the 1000 m and 3000 m events, successfully pulling off to the national team. At World Cup #1 in Calgary, he won his first individual gold in the international stage since his knee injury four years ago. He also contributed to Russia's first-ever relay gold at World Cup #5 in Sochi, making an inside pass that reminded of performances in his heyday.

Ahn came through the Olympic season with flying colors, finishing second in the overall World Cup rankings and winning four golds at the 2014 European Championships. While his knee injury did not allow him to top the 1500 m races that he had dominated when representing Korea, his experience, technique, and exclusive training on the 500 m helped Ahn lead the distance in the World Cup rankings.

2014 Winter Olympics

At the 2014 Winter Olympics, Ahn won the bronze medal in the 1500 m event, which was the first short track speed skating medal that Russia had ever earned. Ahn then won the first Russian gold medal in short track, winning the 1000 m event by leading the first Russian 1–2 finish in short track with Vladimir Grigorev. On February 21, Ahn won his seventh overall and fifth Winter Olympic gold medal when he finished first in the 500 m men's final. With that gold medal, he became the first short track skater to win all four Olympic golds, the 500 m, 1000 m, 1500 m, and 5000 m relay. He also became the short track speed skater with the most Olympic gold medals, with five, which increased to six with a 5000 m relay win later the same day. With that gold, he became the short tracker with the most Olympic medals, at eight, tied with Apolo Ohno; he also became the short tracker with the most Olympic gold medals, at six.

After his victory, Koreans came to an uproar questioning the Korea Skating Union of the reason for Ahn's naturalization, which eventually caused Korean President Park Geun-hye to order an investigation on the issue. Contrary to the public opinion in Korea, Ahn contended that he did not move to Russia because of factionalism. He also added that his father, who had argued Ahn was the victim of faction fight in Korea, was contradicting him, and going to the Olympics was the sole reason why he made the difficult decision to come to Russia. Ahn expressed his concern that though his relationship with the Korean athletes had no problems, the press was making them awkward.

After Sochi
In the 2014 World Championships held a month after the Olympics, Ahn won the 1000 m and finished third in the 3000 m, grabbing his sixth world title by 63 points. He became the only man to win six world championships in the sport.

After his prolific season, Ahn continued his skating career despite a part-move into coaching. He missed the 2015–2016 season due to knee problems and his wife's pregnancy. In an interview after the 2016 World Championships, which he did not take part in but did watch, he told the press that doctors have warned him undergoing extra surgery would jeopardize his career, and thus he is working on adding muscles to relieve the pain.

Ahn continued to win medals at the World and European championships for Russia. He won bronze in the 500 m and silver in the 5000 m relay at the 2017 European Championships, and won silver in the 500 m race at the 2018 European Championships. Although Ahn had planned to retire after participating the 2018 Winter Olympics in his native South Korea, he missed out the Olympics in the wake of the alleged sports doping in Russia.The IOC did not disclose the specific reasons for banning Ahn, only mentioning "lingering suspicions" about doping use regarding the country. Ahn, who had never tested positive for drugs, challenged the decision writing an open letter to IOC President Thomas Bach, but he was not answered.

Retirement
Ahn decided to retire from the sport and return to his home country of South Korea after rejecting an offer to coach the Russian team in September 2018.

After stepping off ice, Ahn starred in the South Korean variety-reality show Real Man 300. He was also noticed working as a player-coach at Korea National Sports University.

In February 2019, Ahn reversed his decision, announcing that he wanted to compete as an athlete.
Aged 33, he won silver in the 500 m and 1000 m races respectively at the ISU Short Track Speed Skating World Cup in Salt Lake City and Shanghai before anchoring Russia to gold in the mixed gender 2,000 m relay and men's 5,000 m relay.

In April 2020, Ahn revealed that knee problems were affecting his ability to train and that it was time for him to finally finish his skating career. In his retirement statement, he announced he will continue to work for the sport.

2020s

2022 Winter Olympics 

In 2018, Ahn was offered a coaching position for China's national speed skating team by Wang Meng, who had been Ahn's acquaintance since 2002. Although Ahn declined the offer in 2018, he accepted the offer in late 2019.

As the top assistant of Kim Sun-tae, head coach for China's short track team in the 2022 Winter Olympics and previous head coach for Korea's short track team in the 2018 Winter Olympics, Ahn helped Chinese players win two gold medals, one silver medal, and one bronze medal in Beijing. His training style was to skate with the athletes throughout the sessions, so that they could naturally learn how to make steps.

When Korean skaters were disqualified during the men's 1000 m semifinals, arousing short track speed skating controversies, South Korean netizens directed anger and criticism towards Ahn, who was seen congratulating his team for winning gold in the 2000 m mixed relay. Not responding to interview requests during the Games, Ahn shared his thoughts on the issue in March in an interview with the Korean press by saying, "I kept a stiff upper lip because I didn't want to be an irresponsible person. Due to the nature of the sport, judgment problems can occur at any time. All players come to the game with the mindset that they should be careful about decision issues, but the unexpected often happens on ice." Regarding the accusations that were poured on not only him but also his family, Ahn said, "It suddenly occurred to me that if I gave up short track speed skating, this controversy would end," adding, "I thought I had been supported for my passion and games, but it was heartbreaking to see unexpected things lead to criticism." He yet stated that despite the adversities, he won't be leaving the sport.

After the Olympics, Ahn rejected a four-year coaching position and returned to Korea, having not met his family for 19 months due to Covid-19 situations.

Failure to return to South Korea for coaching 
In 2023, Ahn returned to South Korea and applied to be a coach for Seongnam City's short track speed skating team. However, he is under huge criticism from the South Korean short track speed skating coaches as he has helped South Korean rival China to gain medals during the 2022 Beijing Olympics. The Korea skating coach union urged "Seongnam City to appoint a coach that meets the public eye level" and criticized Ahn that he "lied during the naturalization process and betrayed his country", avoiding the fact that Ahn was mistreated by the Korean skating federation after his injuries.  In late January, Seongnam City's short track speed skating team announced that no one is qualified to be a coach, meaning that Ahn is unlikely to be coach for his homeland. since then, the Korea skating coach union has been known as a close aide to a specific candidate, and suspicions have been raised that the disciplinary history of a specific candidate has not been raised. In response, Three-time Olympic champion Choi Min-jeong released a joint statement on social media asking for a "fair and transparent" process, as she believed that the recruitment should not be "swayed by any outside influence" and it is important to "bring in the most competent candidate who can communicate with us". 

After Seongnam City has since announced that there are no successful candidates. As a result, some South Korean media outlets suggested that there was a factional power struggle and political involvement in the ice skating world.

Following South Korea's rejection of Viktor Ahn, through TASS, Russian Skating Union president expressed that they would like to appoint Ahn. In 2022, Russia invited Viktor Ahn to become an advisor to the Skating Union, but he refused due to objections by Ahn's wife. While Russia sports media outlet Sport Express urged Ahn to return to Russia as a leader.

On February 7, Viktor Ahn expressed his position on the controversy over Russian naturalization on his social network service (SNS) after "receiving a lump-sum payment of the athletes' pension," which the Korea skating coach union pointed out as a moral issue. At first, he thought dual citizenship was possible. However, when he found out that he had to give up his Korean nationality, he decided that it was right to return the Olympic medal pension he received. And before naturalization in Russia, he made a full donation to "children in need of heart surgery and junior athletes in need of rehabilitation and treatment." Since then, some of the pensions have been delivered to the family of Noh Jin-kyu, his junior athlete at the Korean National Sport University, according to a South Korean ice skating official. Ahn then said that he would humbly accept the criticism of choosing naturalization for any reason, but he said he would raise speak out when there is misunderstanding.

On February 9, The Hankyoreh pointed out Seongnam City's negligence in administration in that Ahn's coaching support was exposed in advance in connection with the recruitment of the ice skating team at Seongnam City. While the Korea Skating Coaches Union pointed out that it was not the opinion of the Korean ice skating leaders as a whole, and that it was a serious problem for the media to report the opinions of certain unofficial organizations as the opinions of the entire leaders.

Style 
 "Ahn is a master of short track speed skating, particularly in controlling the track during competition." - Wu Dajing

 "In terms of his racing strategy, when he's following the other skaters, he's not really just following. He's always waiting for that perfect chance to pass." - Chae Ji-hoon

 "Viktor Ahn, as he's now called, is the most beautiful short track skating athlete in the world in terms of his technique and the way he skates." "If there is any athlete that is designed for short track, body-type wise, it is him," "If you watch him stand and jog, his pelvic is tilted forward naturally, which is perfect for a skater. He has incredible technique, tons of experience." - Apolo Anton Ohno

Awards and honors
Representing Korea
Ahn was awarded the Outstanding Player Award at the Sports Chosun Coca-Cola Sports Awards in January 2006. After his victory in Torino, he was selected as Player of the Month by the American Sports Academy. He was also named as honorary ambassador for the PyeongChang Winter Olympics bidding committee with Jin Sun-yu.

In 2008, Ahn was selected as the Most Valuable Player with Lee Kyou-hyuk and Yuna Kim by the Korea Skating Union. In the same year, he also received the Men's Team Award at the Asian Sports Awards.

Ahn was chosen as the ambassador for the Korea Sports Promotion Foundation in 2009.

Representing Russia
In March 2013, Ahn was named as Honored Master of Sports by the Russian Federation.

After his feat in Sochi, Ahn was awarded the Order "For Merit to the Fatherland" from Russian President Vladimir Putin and the Medal "For Strengthening the Combat Commonwealth". He was also selected Most Valuable Player in the Sochi Winter Olympics by NBC, and 2014 Athlete of the Year by the Russian edition of 'GQ' magazine. In light of his status as a South Korean-born Russian, Ahn was further named as honorary ambassador for the 2014-2015 Korea-Russia Year of Mutual Visit in 2014.

In 2016, Ahn received the Proud Alumnus Award at his alma mater. He was also inducted into the Korea National Sports University Ice Rink Hall of Fame as the 2006 Winter Olympics champion and the Sochi Walk of Fame as the 2014 Winter Olympics champion.

Personal life
Ahn is married to Woo Nari, a Korean born in 1983. Nari was a member of Ahn's fan club. Ahn said that her presence and care helped him adapt to Russia. Their daughter was born in December 2015. But his wife, Woo Nari, couldn't endure the life in Russia and missed South Korea, so eventually left  Russia. The Russian media reported that his wife wanted to raise their daughter in South Korea, and Viktor Ahn's choice to go to South Korea was influenced by his wife.

Ahn's younger brother is speed skater Ahn Hyun-Jun. He made the Korean national speed skating team for the 2022–23 season. The younger Ahn switched from short track to speed skating in 2021.

Russian citizenship

Ahn trained in Russia and received Russian citizenship to compete for Russia in the 2014 Winter Olympics. Ahn's father stated that the decision was due to lack of support from the South Korean skating association. Prior to moving to Russia, Ahn did not know the Russian language and had no familial ties to Russia. He had considered competing for the United States, but found that the process for gaining Russian citizenship was much easier. He chose "Viktor" as his Russian name as it derived from Victory, and to pay tribute to Viktor Tsoi, a Soviet rock star of ethnic Korean descent.

In South Korea, fury erupted over the loss of Ahn to Team Russia, after his participation in the 2014 Winter Olympics. Several newspapers reported the scorn of the South Korean public and newspaper editors on the actions of the skating federation. Right after the Olympics, the Minister of Sports and President Park Geun-hye of South Korea both promised action in rooting out corruption and feuding at the organization that may have led to Ahn's "defection", in a bid to clean it up in preparation for the 2018 Winter Olympics in South Korea. In September 2018, Ahn announced his retirement from short track and moved back to South Korea. The South Korean public was generally supportive of Ahn in early 2014, but he also received online bashing amidst controversies at Sochi and in later years. In 2023, Ahn sought a coaching position in South Korea, despite having renounced his South Korean citizenship when becoming Russian. He was denied that position due to significant public opposition.

In the media
In the 2010–2011 season, Ahn served as a short track commentator for SBS Sports. He covered the World Cup series (#3~#6) and the World Championships.

From 2014 to 2016, he guest-starred in three episodes of Russia's late-night talk show Evening Urgant (episodes S3.E90, S4.E104, S5.E157).

From 2017 to 2018, Ahn guest-starred in the South Korean variety-reality show The Return of Superman (episodes 202~204, 237, 241) with his daughter.

In 2018, he starred in the South Korean variety-reality show Real Man 300 (episodes 1~15, 18).

Other television appearances of Ahn are as follows:
 Han Su-jin's Sunday Click (South Korean talk show) - with Jin Sun-yu (episode 49) 
 Human Docu Love (South Korean documentary) - with wife Woo Nari (episodes 44, 45) 
 Live Talk Show Taxi (South Korean talk show) - with wife Woo Nari (episode 488)

Detailed results

Olympics results

World Championships 
Six-time Overall world champion. 20 world titles. 18 gold medals. 

 

Overall and individual distances, podiums

Relay and Team, Podiums

World Cup 
2 times Overall World Cup winner, 6 time individual distances World Cup winner, 67 World Cup victories

World Cup Ranking Podiums

International competitions

National competitions

References

External links

Victor An at ShorttrackOnLine.info
Victor An at Olympics.com
Victor An at Olympedia
Victor An at Sports-Reference.com (archived)
Victor An at IMDb

1985 births
Living people
Russian male short track speed skaters
South Korean male short track speed skaters
Short track speed skaters at the 2002 Winter Olympics
Short track speed skaters at the 2006 Winter Olympics
Short track speed skaters at the 2014 Winter Olympics
Olympic short track speed skaters of Russia
Olympic short track speed skaters of South Korea
Olympic bronze medalists for Russia
Olympic bronze medalists for South Korea
Olympic gold medalists for Russia
Olympic gold medalists for South Korea
Olympic medalists in short track speed skating
Medalists at the 2006 Winter Olympics
Medalists at the 2014 Winter Olympics
Russian people of Korean descent
Naturalised citizens of Russia
South Korean emigrants to Russia
Speed skaters from Seoul
Asian Games medalists in short track speed skating
Short track speed skaters at the 2003 Asian Winter Games
Short track speed skaters at the 2007 Asian Winter Games
Asian Games gold medalists for South Korea
Asian Games silver medalists for South Korea
Medalists at the 2003 Asian Winter Games
Medalists at the 2007 Asian Winter Games
South Korean male speed skaters
Russian male speed skaters
Universiade medalists in short track speed skating
World Short Track Speed Skating Championships medalists
Recipients of the Order "For Merit to the Fatherland", 4th class
Universiade gold medalists for South Korea
Universiade bronze medalists for South Korea
Competitors at the 2005 Winter Universiade